Eric Buyse (born 27 March 1940 in Lauwe) is a Belgian former football player. He played as left-footed forward, and midfielder in a later stage of his career.

Buyse played most of his career for Cercle Brugge; a successful era. He won second division in 1961 and third division in 1968. He also became twice top scorer of the team, and has until today scored the 10th most goals for Cercle.

After his career with the green and black Bruges side, Buyse became player-coach of VG Oostende after the VG Oostende coach quickly was fired in the 1970-71 season. Buyse remained player-coach until 1976, the last 4 years with West Flanders lower league side Excelsior Zedelgem.

After his playing career, Buyse returned to Cercle Brugge. He eventually quit football with a short managerial spell at Exc. Zedelgem.

External links
Eric Buyse at Cerclemuseum.be 

1940 births
Living people
People from Menen
Belgian footballers
Association football midfielders
Association football forwards
Belgian Pro League players
Cercle Brugge K.S.V. players
Player-coaches
Belgian football managers
Footballers from West Flanders